Hakan Arıkan (born 17 August 1982) is a Turkish former footballer who played as a goalkeeper.

Club career

Raising to fame
Arıkan had begun his career at Petkimspor, an amateur team based in western Turkish city of İzmit. He then joined Kocaelispor in 2001. During his time with Kocaeli, he played both for senior and youth teams for almost three seasons until he began to play regularly as the number one keeper.

Arıkan joined Ankaraspor in 2006. He was called up to the Turkish National Team squad, for the very first time, during a friendly game, after he had shown an impressive performance for Ankaraspor, by saving two penalties in a 1–1 draw against Galatasaray on the very first match day in 2006/07 Season. Arıkan finished that season off with conceding 27 goals in 26 matches.

Beşiktaş era
He joined Beşiktaş in exchange with keeper Ramazan Kurşunlu plus 0.7 million Euros. He has played alternately with Rüştü Reçber in 2007/08 Season.After a couple of years of being Rüştü Reçber's under study he finally became a regular for his team in the 2010-11 season along with Cenk Gönen making important saves several times including a back to back save in the same second against Rapid Wien.

International career
Arıkan was initially called up for the national team before the match against Georgia in February 2007. He made his debut on 5 June 2007 against Brazil, in a game dedicated to Tugay Kerimoğlu's last cap for national team. He could not find a place in Euro 2008 selection.

References 

 Hakan Arıkan ile yollar ayrıldı, fanatik.com.tr, 30 November 2015
 Osmanlıspor'da çifte transfer, 12 January 2016

External links 
 
 

1982 births
Ankaraspor footballers
Beşiktaş J.K. footballers
Mersin İdman Yurdu footballers
Antalyaspor footballers
Kayserispor footballers
Trabzonspor footballers
Living people
Turkish footballers
Turkey international footballers
Turkey B international footballers
Süper Lig players
Association football goalkeepers
People from Karamürsel